Perfect Now is the third studio album by Swedish singer Jessica Andersson. The album was released in April 2015 and peaked at number three on the Swedish Albums Chart. The album includes her Melodifestivalen 2015 song, "Can't Hurt Me Now".

Reception

Sigrid Ejemar was critical of the album, even questioning "perfect" in the title. Ejemar said "Perhaps the album has been called "Perfect" in the sense that there is no harm or personality here." saying the most exciting part is "the sparkling background Andersson poses in front of the cover". 
Ejemer complemented schlager songs "Start Over" and "Can't Hurt Me Now".

Johanna Karlsson was also critical saying "This album sounds very much like a Taylor Swift album, and it's not bad, but the problem is that Jessica Andersson is not actually Taylor Swift. There is no clear sender at all in this project and there is also no clear direction. Therefore, despite the spotless production, it becomes never engaging."

Track listing

Charts

Release history

References 

2015 albums
Jessica Andersson albums
Universal Music Group albums